The 2010 FIA GT1 Algarve round was an auto race held at the Autódromo Internacional do Algarve, Portimão, Portugal on 17–19 September 2010.  Serving as the seventh round of the 2010 FIA GT1 World Championship season, the FIA GT1 race served as part of the larger Portimão Supercar event and was joined by the FIA GT3 European Championship, GT4 European Cup, and Superleague Formula.  The former FIA GT Championship previously raced at the Algarve circuit in 2009.

Background

As part of the FIA Balance of Performance, Ford GTs were allowed the team to increase the size of their air restrictors for more power, although the cars also had to carry an extra  of ballast.  Further, six teams entered the Portimão round with success ballast.  The No. 7 Young Driver which won the previous round at the Nürburgring carried , while further top four finishers Reiter, Phoenix, and Hexis also gained ballast.  The No. 11 Vitaphone entry, which led both the Drivers' and Teams' Championships entering Portimão, retains  of the 20 previously carried in the previous round, while the No. 33 Hegersport car shed 40 kg of ballast carried over from the Nürburgring.

Michael Bartels and Andrea Bertolini of Vitaphone retained the Drivers' Championship lead they had held since the Paul Ricard round, holding a fourteen-point gap over Thomas Mutsch of Matech.  Tomáš Enge and Darren Turner shared third place a further twelve points behind Mutsch.  In the Teams' Championship, Vitaphone also held the points lead by a margin of 26 points over Reiter, while Young Driver were four points further back.

Qualifying
Phoenix's Marc Hennerici was able to put the team's sole Corvette on pole position in the final qualifying session by a margin of three hundredths of a second.  Marc VDS initially earned their best qualifying position to date by claiming the front row in the No. 40 Ford GT, but were later penalized to the back of the grid after their car failed a stall test during technical inspection.  The penalty promoted the No. 23 Sumo Power Nissan to the front row, while the Vitaphone duo locked out the second row on the grid.

Qualifying result
For qualifying, Driver 1 participates in the first and third sessions while Driver 2 participates in only the second session.  The fastest lap for each session is indicated with bold.

Races

Qualifying Race
Alexandros Margaritis led the field away from pole position, taking command for the first half of the race.  After the pit stop and driver change, Sumo Power's Peter Dumbreck was able to catch up to leader Marc Hennerici, eventually passing the Corvette into Turn 1 in the final ten minutes of the race.  The Vitaphone Maserati of Andrea Bertolini, following close behind the two, was eventually able to also pass Hennerici and secure second place

Race result

Championship Race
Following the Qualifying Race win, the Sumo Power Nissan led into the first turn, ahead of the No. 1 Vitaphone Maserati.  Further down the field the No. 38 Münnich Lamborghini spun onto the outside runoff where it was collected by the No. 2 Vitaphone Maserati.  Jamie Campbell-Walter's Nissan was also hit in the first turn, causing steering damage and forcing the team's retirement.  At the opening of the pit window, the two leaders pitted together, but Sumo Power suffered from a tire change problem which dropped them down the race order, handing the lead to Vitaphone's Andrea Bertolini.  The Phoenix Racing Corvette was promoted into second after the pit stops before being overtaken by Richard Westbrook in the No. 5 Matech Ford.  Westbrook attempted to chase down the leading Maserati, but was only able to come within a second and a half at the end of the race.

Race result

References

External links
 Algarve GT1 Race in Portugal – FIA GT1 World Championship

Algarve
FIA GT1